Meriandra dianthera, commonly known as Bengal sage and Bengal salvia (hi:कफ़ूर का पात), is a plant with a mint flavor that is cultivated for medical purposes.

References

Medicinal plants
Lamiaceae